Full stack, full-stack or fullstack might refer to;

 Full stack, a player positioning strategy in the sport of pickleball
 Fullstack Academy, a software engineering bootcamp
 Full-stack developer, a software developer able to work at all levels of the program stack